Southeast of Saline Secondary School is a K-12 school, located approximately 4 miles west of Gypsum, Kansas, United States, on the south side of Highway K-4.  It is operated by Southeast of Saline USD 306.

The school's enrollment is approximately 700 students from the communities of Gypsum, Assaria, Kipp, and Mentor.  The school colors are purple and white and the mascot is the Trojan.

See also
 List of high schools in Kansas
 List of unified school districts in Kansas

External links
 Official webpage
 USD 306 School District Boundary Map, KDOT

Public high schools in Kansas
Schools in Saline County, Kansas
Public middle schools in Kansas
Public elementary schools in Kansas